Till Dad Do Us Part  is a 2001 television comedy film directed by Randall Miller, written by Douglas Soesbe, and starring John Larroquette, Markie Post, and Jeffrey Jones. It was originally televised on the Fox Family Channel on June 17, 2001.

Premise
An overly controlling father tries to dissuade his adored daughter from marrying the man of her dreams, someone of whom the father does not approve.  Meddling in her life, the father tries to find a more suitable candidate but ends up making things worse.

Cast
John Larroquette as Gavin Corbett
Markie Post as Virginia Corbett
Emily Holmes as Rebecca Corbett
Jonathan Cherry as Dennis Quilantip
Adam Harrington as Brent Fenwick
Jeffrey Jones as Brady

External links
 

2001 films
2001 comedy films
2001 television films
American comedy television films
Films directed by Randall Miller
2000s English-language films